Dionísio Tomé Dias (born 11 August 1943) is a São Toméan politician. He was President of the country's National Assembly from April 18 2002 to May 18, 2006. He succeeded by Francisco Fortunato Pires and was later succeeded by Francisco da Silva as foreign minister.

References

1943 births
Presidents of the National Assembly (São Tomé and Príncipe)
Living people